Hurricane Joyce caused minor impact in the ABC and Windward islands during late September and early October 2000. The fourteenth tropical cyclone, tenth named storm, and sixth hurricane of the 2000 Atlantic hurricane season, Joyce developed from a tropical wave located southwest of Cape Verde on September 25. Only twelve hours after becoming a cyclone, the depression was upgraded to Tropical Storm Joyce early on September 26. Joyce continued to strengthen and became a hurricane by September 27. After peak intensity on September 28, unfavorable conditions caused Joyce to become disorganized and weaken.

Late on September 29, Joyce was downgraded to a tropical storm while centered well east of the Lesser Antilles. In contrast with predictions, Joyce continued to weaken and became a tropical depression on October 1 while crossing through the southern Windward Islands. Early on the following day, Joyce degenerated into a tropical wave over the southeast Caribbean Sea. The remnants were monitored for regeneration, but never developed back into a tropical cyclone. Overall, impact from Joyce was minimal, limited to mainly rainfall and near-tropical storm force winds in Trinidad and Tobago and Barbados. The remnants of Joyce also caused similar effects on the ABC islands and Dominican Republic, which resulted in minor damage.

Meteorological history

Joyce originated from a tropical wave that emerged from the coast of Africa on September 22. It would never change from that general path. While in the deep tropics of the open Atlantic, the wave began to show indications of a closed circulation. Satellite data was ambiguous, but the evidence favored the existence of a tropical cyclone, and the system was designated Tropical Depression Fourteen. At the next advisory, the cyclone was upgraded and named "Joyce", although satellite data was still ambiguous about whether Joyce even had a circulation. Under the continued influence of the ridge, Joyce headed westward and steadily intensified. Deep convection and outflow improved, and Joyce gradually developed an eye. On September 27, it was upgraded to a hurricane with cold cloud tops. At the time, it was located about midway between Africa and the Lesser Antilles.

Wind shear then increased, partially exposing Joyce's center of circulation, although bursts of convection remained. Convection and organization slowly deteriorated, and became, early on September 29, "pretty crummy" and without a well-defined center of circulation. Joyce did manage to remain at hurricane intensity through this time. Due to the disorganization, it was downgraded to a tropical storm later that day. Despite occasional bursts of convection, Joyce weakened into a tropical depression as it crossed the Windward Islands on October 1. The weakening was confirmed by Hurricane Hunter reconnaissance flights. After crossing the Windward Islands, and entering the southeastern Caribbean Sea, Joyce unexpectedly degenerated into an open wave. Although Joyce's remnants were monitored for regeneration, any possible redevelopment never materialized.

Joyce dissipated in an area of low wind shear and warm sea surface temperatures. The National Hurricane Center attributed the weakening to dry air from the Sahara. The dry air may have been caused by a lack of southwesterlies bring moisture from equatorial areas, and continental influence from South America.

Forecasting and impact

Joyce's track was well forecast, with errors ten to twenty percent smaller than the ten-year average. In general, Joyce persistently stayed south of where it was forecast to be. By contrast, intensity forecasts had large errors. Indeed, at 0900 UTC on October 2 Joyce was forecast to be a  tropical storm three days out, when in reality the storm dissipated six hours later. These forecast errors were blamed on Joyce's surprise dissipation.

On September 30, a tropical storm watch was issued for the Windward Islands from St. Vincent and the Grenadines south to Trinidad and Tobago. One hour later, the watch was extended to Saint Lucia. Later that day, the watches were upgraded to warnings in Trinidad and Tobago and Grenada. On October 1, Trinidad's warning was downgraded to a watch. After that, the watches and warnings were gradually discontinued, first in Barbados and St. Vincent and the Grenadines, then Trinidad and Saint Lucia, then Tobago, and finally Grenada. In response to the approaching hurricane, emergency operations centers in Grenada and both main islands of Trinidad and Tobago were placed on alert.

Barbados experienced the highest sustained winds Joyce brought to any land area. Neither Barbados, Trinidad and Tobago, nor Grenada reported serious effects from Joyce. After degenerating into an open wave, Joyce's remnants passed over the ABC Islands, where locally heavy thunderstorms and light winds were reported on October 2. A tropical wave related to Joyce's decay was blamed for flooding in the Dominican Republic, where rain caused the Mao, Amina, and Yaque del Norte Rivers to burst their banks, flooding thousands of hectares of banana and rice crops. Damage was reported in communities in the northeastern part of the country. No other impact was reported, and no deaths were blamed on Joyce.

Officials from Trinidad and Tobago reported that Joyce made landfall in that country. The National Hurricane Center differs, not attributing any landfall to Joyce. If Joyce really made landfall on Tobago, it would have been the first tropical storm to do so since 1990's Arthur.

See also

List of South America hurricanes
Other tropical cyclones named Joyce
2000 Atlantic hurricane season
 Hurricane Cora (1978)

References

External links

 NHC Tropical Cyclone Report
 NHC Advisory Archive
 Storm path

2000 Atlantic hurricane season
Joyce (2000)
Category 1 Atlantic hurricanes
Hurricanes in Grenada
Hurricanes in Barbados
Hurricanes in the Dominican Republic
Joyce